Manam Virumbuthe Unnai is a 1999 Tamil-language romantic drama film directed by M. Sivachandran. The film stars Prabhu, Meena, Karan and Rajiv Krishna. It was released on 17 December 1999.

Plot

Shanmugam (Prabhu), a widower, has two daughters Kavita (P. Shwetha) and Anita (Baby Ashwini). In fact, the children were abandoned and he has brought up them without they know that they were orphans. Kavita and Anita pressure him to see the photo of their mother Amudha, he describes the girl of his dreams to his friend Sabapathy (Dhamu) who then paints her portrait and Shanmugam shows them the portrait. By chance, the children see Priya (Meena), who looks like the woman in the portrait. Shanmugam, Kavita and Anita go to her home in the city.

Priya's family is an extended and rich family. Her family Prakash (Rajiv Krishna) secretly loves for Priya while Chandru is the supposed to be her future husband. In the city, Shanmugam meets his acquaintance Kaasi (S. S. Chandran) and he brings them to Priya's house. They decide to stay there. Then, Chandru finds out Priya's photo in his luggage. Afterwards, Chandru and Priya begin to tease Shanmugam. Shanmugam loves Priya but after knowing that Prakash is in love with her, he sacrifices his love. Prakash overhears Priya saying that she is the mother of two children. In the marriage, Prakash sends his henchmen to kill Shanmugam but he attacks everyone and Prakash insults Priya by stopping this marriage. Priya leaves the place, Shanmugam urges Prakash to kill him but Prakash breaks down emotionally. In the end, Shanmugam unites with Priya.

Cast

Prabhu as Shanmugam
Meena as Priya
Karan as Chandru
Rajiv Krishna as Prakash
Jai Ganesh as Priya's father
Lakshmi as Saradha, Priya's mother
Delhi Ganesh
Devan as Ramesh
S. S. Chandran as Kaasi
Dhamu as Sabapathy
P. Shwetha as Kavitha
Baby Ashwini as Anita
Latha as Latha

Soundtrack
The soundtrack was composed By Ilaiyaraaja and released by Five Star Audio. The soundtrack received positive reviews.

Reception
A critic rated the film 1.5 out of 4 and praised actor Prabhu's performance.

References

1999 films
Films scored by Ilaiyaraaja
1990s Tamil-language films
Films directed by Sivachandran